DeFuniak Springs is a city in Walton County, Florida, United States. The population was 6,968 as of the 2020 Census. The county seat of Walton County, the city also serves as a hub for many residents in surrounding communities. In 2019, MSN's Insider Online named the city as the "best small town in Florida".

DeFuniak Springs is home to Lake DeFuniak, one of two spring-fed lakes in the world that is nearly perfectly round.

History

The town was founded during the late 19th century as a resort development by the officers of the Pensacola and Atlantic Railroad, a subsidiary of the Louisville and Nashville Railroad. The P&A was organized to connect the terminus of the L&N at Pensacola to the western terminus of a predecessor of the Seaboard Air Line Railroad at River Junction—now Chattahoochee—in the 1880s. The town was named after Frederick R. De Funiak, a vice-president of the L&N. Like much of Northwest Florida, DeFuniak Springs was settled mainly by Scots from Virginia and the Carolinas.

DeFuniak Springs was established as a final-destination resort. The developers enlisted the cooperation and aid of the Chautauqua Movement. The Chautauqua Hall of Brotherhood, an auditorium seating 4,000, was constructed on Lake DeFuniak in the center of town. Seminars, classes, and the like were held in the Hall of Brotherhood building for people on vacation.

The auditorium of the building was severely damaged by Hurricane Eloise in 1975 and razed. In 2003, the Chautauqua Hall of Brotherhood Foundation, Inc., a charitable foundation, started a capital campaign to restore the historic building. The westerly portion of the building facing Circle Drive was still in use at that time.

As part of the intellectual atmosphere of the town, a college and a private high school (named Palmer College and Palmer Academy, respectively), as well as a technical school (Thomas Industrial Institute) and a teacher training school (Florida Normal College) were established in the late 19th century. Florida Normal College was later incorporated into Florida State University. The other schools closed during the Great Depression, which created financial strains. There remains a College Avenue that once led to Palmer College.

In 1886, the town held an important meeting that changed the course of public education in Florida. At this meeting, teachers from around the state formed the Florida Education Association. This teachers' union remains the state's predominant voice for educators and is affiliated with the National Education Association and the American Federation of Teachers.

The town contains other historically significant landmarks. The Walton County Library is located on Circle Drive, the oldest extant library in the state of Florida. The library contains antiquities, including an impressive medieval weapon collection, in addition to many first-edition books. Also situated on Circle Drive are the Walton County Heritage Museum, housed in the former L&N railroad depot, and St. Agatha's Episcopal Church, built in 1895–1896. 

First Presbyterian Church is the only private structure in the Lake Yard, the park surrounding the lake. Although Walton County was opposed to secession, the first monument to the Confederate war dead constructed in Florida is located on the lawn of the Walton County Courthouse.

A chicken processing plant operated by Perdue Farms at DeFuniak Springs was closed in April 2004.

Traditions
The surrounding landscape of Lake DeFuniak is decorated for the holidays between Thanksgiving and New Year's Day to celebrate the holiday season. This is known to locals as the "Christmas Reflections".

Geography
DeFuniak Springs is located at 30°43'N 86°7'W (30.721, –86.119).

The city is located in the Florida Panhandle along Interstate 10 and U.S. Routes 90 and 331. I-10 runs south of the city from west to east, providing access from exit 85 (U.S. Route 331). I-10 leads east  to Tallahassee, the state capital, and west  to Pensacola. U.S. Route 90 runs through the city from west to east as Nelson Avenue, and leads east  to Ponce de Leon and west  to Crestview. U.S. Route 331 is the main north–south route in the city and its main connection to the Gulf coast. U.S. 331 leads northwest  to Florala, Alabama and south  to U.S. Route 98 near Santa Rosa Beach. Florida State Road 83 also runs through the city as well, leading south to Santa Rosa Beach (with U.S. 331) and north  to the Florida-Alabama state line.

Climate

DeFuniak Springs has a humid subtropical climate (Cfa).

Education

Public schools
Public schools in Defuniak Springs are run by the Walton County School District.

Walton High School
Walton Middle School
Maude Saunders Elementary School
Mossy Head Elementary School
West DeFuniak Elementary School
Walton Academy

Private schools
First Christian Academy

Library
At the time of planning, the founders of DeFuniak Springs were interested in the adult education movement. For DeFuniak Springs, this movement did not only include the Chautauqua center, McCormick University and Academy, and the State Normal School, but also a community library.

In 1887, a group of women formed the Ladies Library Association and their goal was to establish a library that would become the "little sister" to the Chautauqua center, university, and school. The Ladies Library Association chose a plot of land adjacent to the Chautauqua center and signed a lease for ninety-nine years. By the end of 1887, five years after the initial plan of the village, there was a community library. The Ladies Library Association's main goal of establishing a social library was complete. Initially, the library relied on book donations, but also purchased books from the Ladies Reading Club and a private book owner, J. L. Shearer. The Ladies Library Association persisted and was able to maintain the library, books, and maintenance of the library for quite some time. However, by 1923, the Ladies Library Association was unable to continue to sustain the library and requested city funds, which the city took on gradually. It was not until the 1960s when the subscription fees were finally eliminated and the county and city assumed total responsibility for its maintenance and collection development. Today, the Walton-DeFuniak Library remains in use just as it did when it opened in 1887.

Demographics

As of the census of 2000, there were 5,089 people, 2,105 households, and 1,324 families residing in the city. The racial makeup of the city was 71.78% White, 22.99% African American, 1.00% Native American, 0.51% Asian, 0.08% Pacific Islander, 1.81% from other races, and 1.83% from two or more races. Hispanic or Latino of any race were 3.30% of the population.

There were 2,105 households, out of which 27.4% had children under the age of 18 living with them, 40.7% were married couples living together, 18.4% had a female householder with no husband present, and 37.1% were non-families. 33.5% of all households were made up of individuals, and 16.2% had someone living alone who was 65 years of age or older. The average household size was 2.30 and the average family size was 2.91.

In the city, the population was spread out, with 23.6% under the age of 18, 8.6% from 18 to 24, 24.4% from 25 to 44, 22.2% from 45 to 64, and 21.2% who were 65 years of age or older. The median age was 40 years. For every 100 females, there were 84.9 males. For every 100 females age 18 and over, there were 78.7 males.

The median income for a household in the city was $24,516, and the median income for a family was $28,750. Males had a median income of $24,219 versus $19,255 for females. The per capita income for the city was $13,298. About 18.2% of families and 18.4% of the population were below the poverty line, including 27.6% of those under age 18 and 9.3% of those age 65 or over.

Gallery

Notable people

 Buck Showalter, (b 1956) is a professional baseball manager for the New York Mets.
 Kyrsten Sinema, (b 1976) is a politician serving as the senior United States senator from Arizona .

See also
 Perry L. Biddle House
 Chautauqua Hall of Brotherhood
 DeFuniak Springs Historic District
 St. Agatha's Episcopal Church
 Sun Bright
 Walton County Courthouse
 Walton County Heritage Museum
 Walton-DeFuniak Library

References

External links

 DeFuniak Herald newspaper that serves DeFuniak Springs, Florida is available in full-text with images in Florida Digital Newspaper Library

County seats in Florida
Cities in Walton County, Florida
Cities in Florida
1880s establishments in Florida
Populated places established in the 1880s